Andrée Laforest is a Canadian politician, who was elected to the National Assembly of Quebec in the 2018 provincial election. She represents the electoral district of Chicoutimi as a member of the Coalition Avenir Québec.

She was named Ministre des Affaires municipales et de l'Habitation in the François Legault Government of the 42nd legislature of Quebec.

Cabinet posts

References

Living people
Coalition Avenir Québec MNAs
French Quebecers
Members of the Executive Council of Quebec
Women government ministers of Canada
Women MNAs in Quebec
Politicians from Saguenay, Quebec
21st-century Canadian politicians
21st-century Canadian women politicians
Year of birth missing (living people)